The Värmland Line, previously known as the Northwestern Main Line is a  long railway line between Laxå and the Norway–Sweden border at Charlottenberg Station. In Norway, the line continues as the Kongsvinger Line.

Railway lines in Sweden